Galina Zakharova (born 7 September 1956) is a Russian former long-distance runner who represented the Soviet Union. Her greatest success came at the IAAF World Cross Country Championships where she was the silver medallist in 1984 close behind winner Maricica Puică. She also won a team title with the Soviet women (Yelena Sipatova, Raisa Smekhnova, Tatyana Pozdnyakova) at the 1982 edition, having finished 18th.

She also competed on the track and was the 1984 Soviet champion over 3000 metres. She ranked third in the world for the 1983 in that event courtesy of a run of 8:34.60 minutes. She also ranked in the top five for the season in 1982 over 3000 m and again in 1984 over 1500 metres (setting a lifetime best of 3.57.72 minutes). Prior to her success over shorter distances, she recorded a marathon best of 2:46:48 hours in Moscow in 1981.

Personal bests
800 metres – 1:57.08 min (1984)
1500 metres – 3:57.72 min (1984)
3000 metres – 8:33.40 min (1982)
10,000 metres – 31:15.00 min (1984)
Marathon – 2:46:48 hours (1981)

All info from IAAF profile

International competitions

National titles
Soviet Athletics Championships
3000 metres: 1984

References

External links

Living people
1956 births
Soviet female middle-distance runners
Russian female middle-distance runners
Soviet female long-distance runners
Russian female long-distance runners
Soviet female marathon runners
Russian female marathon runners
Soviet female cross country runners